Paseky may refer to places in the Czech Republic:

Paseky (Písek District), a municipality and village in the South Bohemian Region
Paseky, a village and part of Horní Stropnice in the South Bohemian Region
Paseky, a village and part of Hřibiny-Ledská in the Hradec Králové Region
Paseky, a village and part of Osečany in the Central Bohemian Region
Paseky, a village and part of Proseč in the Pardubice Region
Paseky nad Jizerou, a municipality and village in the Liberec Region